Gila Golan (born 1940, originally Zosia Zawadzka) is an Israeli former fashion model and actress.

Biography

Golan was born in Kraków, Poland, around 1940. Her exact birthday is unknown, as she was hidden from the Nazis at a young age, but she has adopted the date of December 30, 1940, as her birthday. A Catholic family found her left in a bundle at a train station during the Holocaust, and adopted her during the war. Her adopted family named her Zoshia Zavatski. After the war, she went to a home for 'lost' Jewish children. Arriving in Israel in 1951, with the name Zusia Sobetzcki, she became Miriam Goldenberg and continued her schooling in an Orthodox girls' boarding school. Within a few years she had joined a Kibbutz and was studying to be a teacher.

She was spotted by an American photographer and later appeared in the Israeli women's magazine LaIsha. Her new fame landed her a spot in the 1960 national fashion competition, where she won first place and was crowned as Na'arat Israel—"Israel's Maiden of Beauty" (IMB) (not Miss Israel), though she changed her name to Gila Golan to prevent word getting back to her religiously conservative benefactors. After receiving second place in that year's Miss World competition as Israel's representative, she was sent to the United States to raise funds. While modeling in New York, she won a contract with Columbia Pictures.

Director Stanley Kramer started her film career with the role of Elsa Lutz in his 1965 film Ship of Fools. She continued to establish herself in Our Man Flint (1966), I Dream of Jeannie (1966), Three on a Couch (1966), Catch as Catch Can (1967), and The Valley of Gwangi (1969).

Personal life
Golan married Alex Urban but divorced during the 1960s. In 1969, she married Geritol tycoon Matthew (Matty) Bernard Rosenhaus. (Rosenhaus may be best known as one of the Columbia Pictures board members portrayed unflatteringly in the Hollywood non-fiction book Indecent Exposure by David McClintick.) Golan and Rosenhaus had three daughters, Sarita, Hedy, and Loretta, before Rosenhaus died of a heart attack in 1980.

Gila has become very involved in Judaism with a special interest in music and singing (cantors). She lives in Florida with her third husband and now runs an investment business.

References

External links

1940 births
Actresses from Kraków
Israeli beauty pageant winners
Israeli female models
Israeli film actresses
Living people
Miss World 1960 delegates
Polish emigrants to Israel
Miss Israel delegates